Ladji Doucouré (born 28 March 1983 in Juvisy-sur-Orge, department of Essonne in France) is a French track and field athlete.

Biography
Ladji Doucouré's father and mother was Malian and Senegalese respectively. Ladji Doucouré was a football player and decathlete before specializing in hurdling and sprinting. His cousin Abdoulaye Doucouré is a French footballer.

Career
Doucouré finished fourth in the 60 m hurdles final at the 2003 World Indoor Championships. He was eliminated in the 110m hurdles semi-finals of the 2003 World Championships, his debut appearance in a World Championships. Doucouré competed in only one event – the 110 m hurdles – at the 2004 Olympics, his first Olympic Games. He had the fastest time among all the competitors in each of the first two rounds and in the semi-finals. But he finished eighth and last in the final in a time of 13.76 s; he was actually in second place before clipping the last hurdle.

Doucouré won the 60 m hurdles gold medal at the 2005 European Indoor Championships, his first European Championships, Olympic Games or World  Championships medal at the senior level. At the French Athletics Outdoor Championships held in Angers on 15 July 2005, Doucouré won the 110m hurdles for the second consecutive year in a time of 12.97 s, setting a new national outdoor record and becoming he first French athlete to go under 13 seconds in that event. It was the world's best performance that year.  At the 2005 World Championships, Doucouré won the 110m hurdles gold medal in a time of 13:07 s, beating 2004 Olympic Champion Liu Xiang by one hundredth of a second and veteran Allen Johnson by three hundredths of a second. He (together with Ronald Pognon, Eddy De Lépine and Lueyi Dovy) also won the gold medal in the 4×100 metres relay event at the same championships. He was named the 2005 L'Équipe Champion of Champions (France category) for his outstanding performance on the track that year.

Doucouré was eliminated in the 110m hurdles semi-finals of the 2007 World Championships. Doucouré finished fourth in the final of the 110 m hurdles (his only event) at the 2008 Olympics in Beijing. The following year, he started strongly by winning the 60 m hurdles gold medal at the 2009 European Indoor Championships. At the 2012 Olympics in London, he finished last in his semi-final heat of the 110m hurdles – the only event that he entered – and thus did not qualify for the final.

Results in the finals of international competitions
 Note: Only the position and time in the final are indicated

References

External links
 
 
 
 

1983 births
Living people
People from Juvisy-sur-Orge
French people of Malian descent
French decathletes
French male hurdlers
Athletes (track and field) at the 2004 Summer Olympics
Athletes (track and field) at the 2008 Summer Olympics
Athletes (track and field) at the 2012 Summer Olympics
Olympic athletes of France
French sportspeople of Senegalese descent
World Athletics Championships medalists
Sportspeople from Essonne
World Athletics Championships winners